Jesús Enrique Sánchez García (born 31 August 1989), also known as Chapito, is a Mexican professional footballer who plays as a right-back for Liga MX club Guadalajara.

Club career

Guadalajara

Sánchez joined Guadalajara's youth academy in 2008.  He was one of the co-captains of the Chivas under-20 team and helped his team win many youth championships. Sánchez debuted on August 7, 2010, in a 1–0 win against San Luis at the Estadio Alfonso Lastras Ramírez stadium. He scored his first goal on October 9, 2010, against Querétaro at the Estadio La Corregidora. He scored his 2nd goal for chivas in la liga mx against Atlante on the last minutes scoring the 2–0  final score win for chivas his 3rd liga mx goal didn't come till January 2017 against queretaro scoring the only goal in the match giving chivas the victory 1-0

International career

U-23 International appearances
As of 2 September 2011

Honours
Guadalajara
Liga MX: Clausura 2017
Copa MX: Apertura 2015, Clausura 2017
Supercopa MX: 2016
CONCACAF Champions League: 2018
 
Individual
Liga MX Best XI: Clausura 2017

References

External links
  at Chivas Campeón 
 
 
 
 

Living people
1989 births
Mexico youth international footballers
Association football fullbacks
C.D. Guadalajara footballers
Liga MX players
Ascenso MX players
Liga Premier de México players
Tercera División de México players
Footballers from Sonora
Sportspeople from San Luis Río Colorado
Mexican footballers